Antoine Joseph Ghislain "Tony" Smet (16 February 1870, date of death unknown) was a Belgian fencer. He competed in the individual foil and épée events at the 1900 Summer Olympics. He finished the foil event in 14th place.

References

External links

1870 births
Year of death missing
Belgian male fencers
Belgian épée fencers
Belgian foil fencers
Olympic fencers of Belgium
Fencers at the 1900 Summer Olympics
Sportspeople from Tournai
Place of death missing